The 2012 New England Revolution season was the team's seventeenth year of existence, all in Major League Soccer. The team opened its season on March 10 at the San Jose Earthquakes and concluded on October 27 at Montreal Impact. New England's first home league game was March 24 against the Portland Timbers.

Overview

Offseason
The New England Revolution had plenty of turnover during the offseason after finishing in last place in the Eastern Conference the prior year. The Revolution fired longtime coach Steve Nicol after 10 seasons with the club, and hired former long-time New England Revolution defender Jay Heaps to replace Nicol. Heaps had most recently worked as the color commentator for Revolution broadcasts on Comcast SportsNet New England and 98.5 The Sports Hub.

Preseason
The New England Revolution started training camp in Arizona culminating with a scrimmage against the PDL club FC Tucson which the Revolution won 2-1. New England then returned home for a few more weeks of training along with two scrimmages against the Boston College Eagles of the NCAA, both of which ended in Revolution victories.

The Revolution then returned to Arizona in order to participate in the 2012 Desert Diamond Cup. Their successful preseason continued with 3 consecutive victories over the Los Angeles Galaxy, New York Red Bulls and Real Salt Lake in order to advance to the Desert Diamond Cup championship game. The Revolution lost the final to the Galaxy, 4 - 2 in a penalty shoot-out.

March
The Revolution opened the regular season on March 10, 2012 all the way across the country to San Jose, California to face the San Jose Earthquakes. A first half mistake by Revolution captain Shalrie Joseph was converted into a goal by Chris Wondolowski. New England was never able to recover from that mistake and ended up losing their season opener 0-1 to San Jose. One week later, the Revolution traveled to Kansas City, Kansas in order to take on Eastern Conference favorites Sporting Kansas City. Revolution defender Stephen McCarthy was sent off on a controversial tackle in the 14th minute. The Revolution, who were suffering from numerous injuries to their defense corp was unable to survive 76 minutes with only 10 men and ended up losing 0-3 to Sporting Kansas City.

New England had their home opener on Saturday March 24, 2012 against the Portland Timbers at Gillette Stadium. The Revolution came out of the gates fast with a score by new striker Saër Sène in the 1st minute. They were able to shut down the Timbers for the rest of the game and get new head coach Jay Heaps his first MLS victory with a 1-0 result. Once again, the Revolution traveled cross country to Carson, California to face the Los Angeles Galaxy on March 31, 2012. Once again the Revolution scored early off a cross from Shalrie Joseph to rookie Kelyn Rowe for the first goal of his MLS career in the 10th minute. The Revolution attack continued and lead to another goal by Chris Tierney in the 13th minute and added one more to their tally off a Saër Sène goal in the 65th minute. The Galaxy were able to break through and finally score one off the foot of Robbie Keane in the 78th minute, but the Revolution held on to record their 2nd victory of the year, 3-1 over Los Angeles.

Squad

Current roster

Squad information

Player movement

Transfers

In

Out

Squad statistics

Competitions

Preseason

Desert Diamond Cup

Standings

Matches

Major League Soccer 

Kickoff times are in EDT.

Standings

Eastern Conference

Overall table 
Note: the table below has no impact on playoff qualification and is used solely for determining host of the MLS Cup, certain CCL spots, and 2013 MLS draft. The conference tables are the sole determinant for teams qualifying to the playoffs

Results summary

Results by round

U.S. Open Cup

Miscellany

Allocation ranking 
New England is in the #19 position in the MLS Allocation Ranking. The allocation ranking is the mechanism used to determine which MLS club has first priority to acquire a U.S. National Team player who signs with MLS after playing abroad, or a former MLS player who returns to the league after having gone to a club abroad for a transfer fee. A ranking can be traded, provided that part of the compensation received in return is another club's ranking. New England held the #1 position until they selected Juan Toja, which dropped them to the bottom of the order.

International roster spots 
New England has 8 MLS International Roster Slots for use in the 2012 season. Each club in Major League Soccer is allocated 8 international roster spots and no New England trades have been reported.

Future draft pick trades 
Future picks acquired: *2013 MLS SuperDraft Round 2 pick from D.C. United; *2013 MLS SuperDraft Round 2 pick from Chivas USA.
Future picks traded: None.

Notes

External links
 2012 Fixtures and Results

New England Revolution seasons
New England Revolution
New England Revolution
New England Revolution
Sports competitions in Foxborough, Massachusetts